Meredith McGrath and Larisa Savchenko were the defending champions but only Savchenko competed that year with Katrina Adams.

Adams and Savchenko lost in the semifinals to Gigi Fernández and Natasha Zvereva.

Lindsay Davenport and Jana Novotná won in the final 6–2, 3–6, 6–2 against Fernández and Zvereva.

Seeds
Champion seeds are indicated in bold text while text in italics indicates the round in which those seeds were eliminated. The top four seeded teams received byes into the second round.

Draw

Finals

Top half

Bottom half

External links
 1997 WTA German Open Doubles Draw

WTA German Open
1997 WTA Tour